Yaguarón is a district in Paraguarí Department, Paraguay. The district seat is the town of Yaguarón. The name of the district and the town means "big dog" in Guaraní language.